The Annual Review of Psychology is a peer-reviewed academic journal that publishes review articles about psychology. First published in 1950, its longest-serving editors have been Mark Rosenzweig (1969–1994) and Susan Fiske (2000–present). As of 2022, Journal Citation Reports gives the journal a 2021 impact factor as 27.782, ranking it first of 79 journal titles in the category "Psychology (Science)" and second of 147 titles in the category "Psychology, Multidisciplinary (Social Science)".

History
In 1947, the board of directors of the publishing company Annual Reviews asked a number of psychologists if it would be useful to have a journal that published an annual volume of review articles that summarized recent developments in the field. Responses were very positive, so in September 1947 they announced that the first volume of the Annual Review of Psychology would be published in 1950. Previous attempts to establish such a journal in the early 1940s were stymied by World War II, which hampered international scientific communication. Its first editor was Calvin Perry Stone. As of 2020, it was published both in print and electronically. Some of its articles are available online in advance of the volume's publication date.

It defines its scope as covering various aspects of psychology, including human behavioral ecology, sensation and perception, cognition, animal learning and behavior, clinical psychology, psychopathology, developmental psychology, social psychology, personality, environmental psychology, and community psychology. As of 2022, Journal Citation Reports gives the journal a 2021 impact factor as 27.782, ranking it first of 79 journal titles in the category "Psychology (Science)" and second of 147 titles in the category "Psychology, Multidisciplinary (Social Science)". It is abstracted and indexed in Scopus, Science Citation Index Expanded, Social Sciences Citation Index, and Academic Search, among others.

Editorial processes
The Annual Review of Psychology is helmed by the editor. The editor is assisted by the editorial committee, which includes associate editors, regular members, and occasionally guest editors. Guest members participate at the invitation of the editor, and serve terms of one year. All other members of the editorial committee are appointed by the Annual Reviews board of directors and serve five-year terms. The editorial committee determines which topics should be included in each volume and solicits reviews from qualified authors. Unsolicited manuscripts are not accepted. Peer review of accepted manuscripts is undertaken by the editorial committee.

Editors of volumes
Dates indicate publication years in which someone was credited as a lead editor or co-editor of a journal volume. The planning process for a volume begins well before the volume appears, so appointment to the position of lead editor generally occurred prior to the first year shown here. An editor who has retired or died may be credited as a lead editor of a volume that they helped to plan, even if it is published after their retirement or death.

 Calvin Perry Stone (1950–1954)
 Paul R. Farnsworth (1955–1968)
 Paul H. Mussen and Mark Rosenzweig (1969–1974)
 Rosenzweig and Lyman W. Porter (1975–1994)
 Janet T. Spence (1995–1999)
 Susan Fiske (2000–present)

See also
 Annual Review of Clinical Psychology

References

 

Psychology
English-language journals
Annual journals
Publications established in 1950
Psychology journals